Anno von Sangerhausen (died 8 July 1273) served as the Grand Master of the Teutonic Order from 1256 to 1273.

Sangerhausen originated from near Eisleben in Thuringia. His relatives were the vassals of the Thuringian counts.

In 1254 he was named as the Master of the Livonian Order. Two years later he left for the higher position as the Grand Master of the Teutonic Order which he served until his death in 1273.

References

13th-century German nobility
Grand Masters of the Teutonic Order
Masters of the Livonian Order
People from Sangerhausen
1273 deaths
Year of birth unknown